Urton Orchards, on Rt. 3 in Roswell, New Mexico, was listed on the National Register of Historic Places in 1988.

It includes a Queen Anne-style house with a turret and a wraparound porch, and a stone milk house.  The house was built by Urton in 1900, and he lived there until his death in 1929.

Owners in the 1950s, a dentist and his wife, Walter and Carol McPherson, named the property "Tooth Acres".

References

Orchards
National Register of Historic Places in Chaves County, New Mexico
Queen Anne architecture in New Mexico